Apio, also known as apiu is a Balkan Jewish appetizer made from celeriac and carrot and served cold. It is customary to serve the appetizer before the three-day holiday meal.

Etymology

The word Apio is likely derived from the word Apium, which is the Spanish terminology for celery.

History
During the 19th century there was a significant decline in the economic situation of the Balkan Jews in general and the regions of Bulgaria and Macedonia in particular, which coincided with the end of the Ottoman Empire. The Jews lived in poverty and, as happened in many Jewish communities in Europe, purchased the most inexpensive and popular food products and so the food was based on the root of celery and carrots. The Balkan Jews who for many generations preserved the Ladino language called the appetizer after its main ingredient.

Preparation
Apio is prepared by cooking slices of celery root and carrots in a variety of spices suitable for the purpose of the dish, usually herbs and lemon juice or vinegar.

References

Sephardi Jewish cuisine
Israeli cuisine
Carrot dishes